"Coconuts" is a song by German singer-songwriter Kim Petras, released on 3 December 2021 as the second single from her scrapped third studio album Problématique. Originally slated for release in January 2022, the song's release was moved forward to December.

Promotion
Petras performed the song at the 2021 MTV Europe Music Awards. Following this, Petras uploaded a short clip of the EMA performance, alongside a studio snippet of the song onto TikTok, which has since amassed more than 55 thousand uses.

In the beginning of August 2022, Petras confirmed that the song's parent album, titled Problématique, is scrapped and approved listening to the leaked material from it.

Music video
A music video for the song was released on 10 January 2022. The video features her dancing alongside some dancers, while she sings the song. It also features a backdrop with fruits which changes its colour (from blue to orange, and then into pink).

Charts

References

2021 singles
2021 songs
Disco songs
Kim Petras songs
Song recordings produced by Dr. Luke
Songs written by Dr. Luke
Songs written by Kim Petras
Songs written by Ryan Ogren
Republic Records singles